Virgisporangium aurantiacum is a species of bacteria. It is a motile and spored species found in soil.

References

Further reading
Whitman, William B., et al., eds. Bergey's manual® of systematic bacteriology. Vol. 5. Springer, 2012.

External links

LPSN
Type strain of Virgisporangium aurantiacum at BacDive -  the Bacterial Diversity Metadatabase

Micromonosporaceae
Bacteria described in 2001